"Alright Already" is a song written by Byron Hill and JB Rudd, and recorded by American country music artist Larry Stewart.  It was Stewart's first release as a solo artist, following an eight-year tenure as the lead singer of Restless Heart. It was released in February 1993 as the first single from his solo debut album Down the Road. The song peaked at number 5 on the Hot Country Singles & Tracks charts and number 4 on the Canadian RPM country music charts. Stewart charted seven other singles afterward, but only one ("I'll Cry Tomorrow") made the U.S. top 40.

Music video
The music video was directed by Deaton Flanigen and premiered in early 1993.

Chart performance
"Alright Already" debuted at number 64 on the U.S. Billboard Hot Country Singles & Tracks for the week of March 6, 1993.

Year-end charts

References

1993 songs
1993 debut singles
Larry Stewart (singer) songs
Songs written by Byron Hill
Music videos directed by Deaton-Flanigen Productions
Song recordings produced by Scott Hendricks
RCA Records singles